The Fellowship of the Ring is a 1983 board game published by Iron Crown Enterprises.

Gameplay
The Fellowship of the Ring is a game based on The Lord of the Rings covering the period from the flight of the hobbits from the shire to the approach of the Fellowship to Mordor.

Reception
Rick Swan reviewed Fellowship of the Ring in Space Gamer No. 71. Swan commented that "A solitaire system allowing the Fellowship to find its way across the land, making discoveries and encountering resistance along the way, might be a better way to capture the adventurous feel of the books. [...] In any case, in spite of the best intentions, Fellowship of the Ring is little more than a nice try."

References

Board games introduced in 1983
Iron Crown Enterprises games